The William Hoopes House is a historic house located at 204 North Liberty Street in Vermont, Illinois. William Hoopes, a local wagon maker, brickworks owner, and Civil War veteran, had the house built for his family in 1898. Local carpenter William Myers built the house in a T-plan, a vernacular type defined by its T-shaped cross gabled roof and floor plan. The house also includes several Queen Anne decorative elements, such as the smaller gable inside its front gable, its three-sided bay window, and its front porch with ornamental spindlework.

The house was added to the National Register of Historic Places on November 7, 1996.

References

Houses on the National Register of Historic Places in Illinois
Queen Anne architecture in Illinois
Houses completed in 1898
National Register of Historic Places in Fulton County, Illinois
Vermont, Illinois